Bramble is an unincorporated community in Perry Township, Martin County, in the U.S. state of Indiana.

History
A post office was established at Bramble in 1879, and remained in operation until it was discontinued in 1906. The community was named for the original owner of the town site.

Geography

References

Unincorporated communities in Martin County, Indiana
Unincorporated communities in Indiana